Borut Semler (born 25 February 1985) is a Slovenian footballer who plays for USV Hengsberg.

Career
He started his career playing in youth systems of Slovenian side NK Mura and Croatian side NK Varteks before moving to Bayern Munich's youth system in the summer of 2001. He started to play for Bayern Munich's reserve squad in the Regionalliga Süd, the third tier of German football in May 2004 and made his debut for the team in their second-last match of the 2003–04 season, a 3–0 away victory against the reserve squad of 1. FSV Mainz 05. It took him only two minutes to score his first goal for the team as he increased their lead on 2–0 after coming off the bench as a substitute for Erdal Kilicaslan for the final 15 minutes of the match. He played regularly for the team in the following season and scored nine goals in 27 matches. In the 2005–06 season, however, he only made 13 appearances for the team without scoring any goals. In the following season he had seven appearances, but again didn't manage to get on the score sheet. He returned to his youth club Varteks on 18 January 2007. He scored two goals for the club in the Croatian First League in thirteen games. In January 2008 he went back to Slovenia and first signed for NK Domžale, before he was transferred to NK Drava Ptuj in August that year.

International career
Semler has played for Slovenian under-21 team and the senior national team. He made his debut for the Slovenian senior team on 18 August 2004 in a 1–1 draw against Serbia and Montenegro, coming off the bench as a late substitute. He has been capped seven times for the national team between 2004 and 2007.

References

External links
PrvaLiga profile 
Player profile at HNL 

1985 births
Living people
People from Murska Sobota
Prekmurje Slovenes
Slovenian footballers
Association football midfielders
FC Bayern Munich II players
NK Varaždin players
NK Domžale players
NK Drava Ptuj players
Slovenian PrvaLiga players
FC Mordovia Saransk players
FC Akzhayik players
FC Shakhter Karagandy players
NK Dob players
Slovenian expatriate footballers
Slovenian expatriate sportspeople in Germany
Expatriate footballers in Germany
Slovenian expatriate sportspeople in Russia
Expatriate footballers in Russia
Expatriate footballers in Kazakhstan
Expatriate footballers in Austria
Slovenian expatriate sportspeople in Austria
Slovenia youth international footballers
Slovenia under-21 international footballers
Slovenia international footballers
FC Spartak Semey players